AAEON Technology Inc. was first founded in 1992 in Taiwan and has expanded globally since, establishing offices in United States, China, Singapore, Germany, France and the Netherlands. AAEON manufactures and markets a wide range of OEM/ODM industrial PCs worldwide. Its product lines include Embedded Boards & Computer On Module, Applied Computing & Network Appliances, All-in-One HMI Systems & Displays, Digital Signage & Self-Service Kiosk as well as Cloud Computing. In collaboration with manufacturers and vendors such as Seagate, Blue Chip Technology and Sequans, Many of its products are applied in industries such as Machine and Factory Automation, Chemical, Medical, Finance, Education, Transportation. In addition, Digital Signage and Kiosk applications are more prevalent in recent years.

Headquartered in Taipei, Taiwan, AAEON has obtained many certifications throughout the years. It received the ISO-9001 certification and the ISO-14001 certification in 1994 and 1997, respectively. AAEON was awarded the TL9000 certification in 2002 and the ISO 13485 Medical certification in 2007. In addition to numerous awards from Intel and Siemens, they have been the recipient of the Taiwan Symbol of Excellence Award for 11 of the past 12 years. In 2000, AAEON acquired Astech Technology, Inc as part of its Panel PC Division.   AAEON became a public limited company on the Taiwan Stock Exchange in 2001 under TAIEX: 2463. AAEON was removed from the TSE after joining AsusTek Computer Inc. (ASUS) in 2011.

References

1992 establishments in Taiwan
Computer hardware companies
Electronics companies established in 1992
Electronics companies of Taiwan
Asus